Carlos Jorge Fernandes Batalha (born 27 October 1992), better known as Carlos Bebé, is a Cape Verdean footballer who plays as a rightback for Montijo.

International career
Bebé made his professional debut for the Cape Verde national football team in a 0–0 (4–2) penalty shootout win over Andorra on 3 June 2018.

References

External links
 NFT Profile
 Soccerway Profile
 Maisfutebol Profile

1992 births
Living people
Citizens of Cape Verde through descent
Cape Verdean footballers
Association football fullbacks
Cape Verde international footballers
Footballers from Lisbon
Portuguese footballers
C.D. Pinhalnovense players
Campeonato de Portugal (league) players
Portuguese sportspeople of Cape Verdean descent